Corduroy is a textile with a distinctively raised "cord" or wale texture. Modern corduroy is most commonly composed of tufted cords, sometimes exhibiting a channel (bare to the base fabric) between them. Both velvet and corduroy derive from fustian fabric. Corduroy looks as if it is made from multiple cords laid parallel to each other.

Etymology
The word corduroy is from cord and duroy, a coarse woollen cloth made in England in the 18th century. Although the origin of duroy is not attested and although its likely meaning is du roi (of the King), it does not follow that the full phrase corde du roi derives from the cord of the King. This is probably a false etymology.

Variations
Corduroy is made by weaving extra sets of fibre into the base fabric to form vertical ridges called wales. The wales are built so that clear lines can be seen when they are cut into pile.

Corduroy is considered a durable cloth and is found in the construction of trousers, jackets, and shirts. The width of the wales varies between fabric styles and is specified by wale count—the number of wales per inch. The lower the number, the thicker the wales' width (e.g., 4-wale is much thicker than 11-wale). Wale count per inch can vary from 1.5 to 21, although the traditional standard is usually between 10 and 12. Wide wale is more commonly used in trousers, and furniture upholstery (primarily couches); medium, narrow, and fine wale fabrics are usually found in garments worn above the waist.
The primary types of corduroy are:
 Standard wale, at 11 wales/inch, available in many colours
 Pincord (also called pinwale or needlecord), the finest cord, with a count at the upper end of the spectrum (above 16)
 Pigment dyed/printed corduroy, where the fabric is coloured or printed with pigment dyes. The dye is applied to the surface; then, the garment is cut and sewn. When washed during the final manufacturing phase, the pigment dye washes out in an irregular way, creating a vintage look. Because of these subtle colour variations, no two garments of pigment-dyed corduroy are exactly alike, and their colour becomes softer with each washing.

Corduroy is traditionally used in making British country clothing, even though its origin lies in items worn by townspeople in industrial areas. Although it has existed for a long time and has been used in Europe since the 18th century, only in the 20th century did it become global, notably expanding in popularity during the 1970s.

Other names
Other names are often used for corduroy. Alternative names include: corded velveteen, elephant cord (the thick-stripes version), pin cord, Manchester cloth and cords.

In continental Europe, corduroy is known as "Cord", "rib cord" or "rib velvet" - in parts of Europe such as Germany, the Czech Republic, Slovakia, the Netherlands and Belgium it used to be simply known as "Manchester" - that still remains the current name for corduroy in Swedish. In Portugal, corduroy is associated with a completely different type of fabric, "bombazine", and is referred to as such. In Greece and Cyprus they are known as kotlé pants. In Iran they are referred to as “Makhmal Kebrity” (velvet matchstick) or just “kebrity” (matchstick) pants as the width of a cord resembles that of a matchstick.

See also
 Bedford cord
 Corduroy road
 Corduroy, children's picture book by Don Freeman
 Corduroy, countryside book by Adrian Bell, published in 1930

References

External links

Woven fabrics